Theodore I (died 729) was the Duke of Naples for a decade beginning in 719. He was titled "hypatos and doux".

During his tenure, he founded a church dedicated to saints John and Paul.

Sources
Gay, Jules. L'Italie méridionale et l'empire Byzantin: Livre I. Burt Franklin: New York, 1904.

729 deaths
8th-century dukes of Naples
Year of birth unknown